Three warships of the Polish Navy have borne the name ORP Gryf, named after the Polish word for griffon:

 , a large minelayer launched in 1936 and notable for her role during the Invasion of Poland in 1939. She was sunk in Hel harbour by German planes on 3 September 1939.
 , a school and hospital ship of the Polish Navy, launched in 1944 as the German ship Irene Oldendorff and acquired in 1950 by the Polish Navy. Rebuilt as a school and hospital ship, she was initially named ORP Zetempowiec, being renamed Gryf in 1957. She was decommissioned in 1976 but continued in use as a heating barge and accommodation ship.
 , a school and hospital ship of the Polish Navy. She was launched in 1976 as a replacement for the earlier Gryf and is currently in service. 

Polish Navy ship names